Abacetus fuscus is a species of ground beetle in the subfamily Pterostichinae. It was described by Straneo in 1941.

References

fuscus
Beetles described in 1941